"Punch and Judy" is a song by the British neo-progressive rock band Marillion. It was the first single from their second studio album Fugazi. The lyrics of the song are about a marriage gone bad.

The single reached no. 29 on the UK Singles Chart in February 1984. This was the only single during the band's EMI years that no music video was shot for.

A CD replica of the single was also part of a collectors box-set released in July 2000, which contained Marillion's first twelve singles and was re-issued as a 3-CD set in 2009 (see The Singles '82-'88).

B-sides
The B-side on all formats contained new versions of "Market Square Heroes" (originally the A-side of the band's debut single) and "Three Boats Down from the Candy" (the B-side of "Market Square Heroes"). Both versions were re-recorded with drummer John Marter (erroneously credited as 'John Martyr'), the only tracks Marillion ever recorded with him.

The only difference between the 7" and 12" versions is found in "Market Square Heroes", which is 49 seconds longer on the 12" version.

These re-recorded versions would also appear on the B'Sides Themselves compilation in 1988;  "Market Square Heroes" is also on the 1997 compilation The Best of Both Worlds.

The originally planned B-side, "Emerald Lies", ended up instead on the Fugazi album.

Track listing

7" versions

Side 1
"Punch & Judy" – 3:19

Side 2
"Market Square Heroes" [Edited re-recorded version] – 3:56
"Three Boats Down From The Candy" [Re-recorded version] – 3:59

12" versions

Side 1
"Punch & Judy" – 3:19

Side 2
"Market Square Heroes" [Full re-recorded version] – 4:45 
"Three Boats Down From The Candy" [Re-recorded version] – 3:59

Personnel
Fish – vocals
Steve Rothery - guitars
Mark Kelly - keyboards
Pete Trewavas - bass
Ian Mosley - drums on "Punch and Judy"
John Marter (credited as 'John Martyr') - drums on "Market Square Heroes", "Three Boats Down From the Candy"

References

1984 singles
Marillion songs
EMI Records singles
1984 songs
Songs written by Fish (singer)
Songs written by Mark Kelly (keyboardist)
Songs written by Steve Rothery
Songs written by Pete Trewavas